Xing Chongzhi (1927–2000) was a People's Republic of China politician. He was born in She County, Hebei. He was Communist Party of China Committee Secretary of Hebei Province (1986–1993).

1927 births
2000 deaths
People's Republic of China politicians from Hebei
Chinese Communist Party politicians from Hebei
Members of the Standing Committee of the 8th Chinese People's Political Consultative Conference
Members of the 12th Central Committee of the Chinese Communist Party
Members of the 13th Central Committee of the Chinese Communist Party